William James Watson (31 January 1931 – 29 December 2018) was an Australian cricketer who played in four Test matches in 1955.

Biography 
A right-handed opening batsman, he made 155 for New South Wales against the MCC at Sydney in 1954–55 in his second first-class match. Largely on the strength of that innings, and after only four first-class matches, he was selected in the Sydney Test that began on 25 February 1955, opening with Colin McDonald. He made only 18 and 3, but managed to impress selectors enough that he was picked for the West Indies tour a few weeks later. Although he scored 122 against Barbados, Watson failed to find form against the West Indians in the Tests, scoring 27, 6, 22 not out, 30 and 0, and was dropped after the Fourth Test.

He scored strongly for New South Wales in the 1956-57 domestic season, with 664 runs at 44.26. The season included his highest score, 206, at number five, in an innings victory over Western Australia in Perth, and, opening the batting again, 50 and 198 against Queensland in Sydney. He was selected for an Australian team that toured New Zealand at the end of the season, but made only 23 runs in four first-class matches and was overlooked for selection on the tour to South Africa in 1957–58.

In 14 matches in the next four seasons, he made only 450 runs at 25.00, and he retired after the 1960–61 season.

References

External links

1931 births
2018 deaths
Australia Test cricketers
New South Wales cricketers
Australian cricketers